Věra Růžičková (10 August 1928 – 24 November 2018) was a Czech gymnast who competed in the 1948 Summer Olympics, winning gold in the team event. She was born in Brno.

References

External links 
 
 
 
 

1928 births
2018 deaths
Czech female artistic gymnasts
Olympic gymnasts of Czechoslovakia
Gymnasts at the 1948 Summer Olympics
Olympic gold medalists for Czechoslovakia
Olympic medalists in gymnastics
Sportspeople from Brno
Medalists at the 1948 Summer Olympics
Recipients of Medal of Merit (Czech Republic)